Cumanotus cuenoti is a species of sea slug, an aeolid nudibranch, a marine gastropod mollusc in the family Cumanotidae.

Distribution
This species was described from the Bay of Arcachon, France, . It is not known from elsewhere.

References

Cumanotidae
Gastropods described in 1948
Taxa named by Alice Pruvot-Fol